Jessica Cash is a British soprano and voice coach. Among her students were Dame Emma Kirkby, Evelyn Tubb and Lesley Garrett. Cash was a graduate of The Royal College of Music.

References

Alumni of the Royal College of Music
Living people
Year of birth missing (living people)
British voice coaches